Kinga Tshering (born 20 December 1966) is a Bhutanese businessman and politician. He served in the public sector for 23 years in the Bhutan, most recently as the Member of Parliament in the National Assembly. He has experience in legislation, organization building with formation of Bhutan Power Corporation (BPC), Bhutan Electricity Authority (BEA) and Druk Holding and Investments (DHI).  He also has experience in the financial sector, banking, energy and infrastructure projects in the capacity of a CEO and a board member.

He led corporate restructuring, change management, strategy, and social enterprises. He has stated as a goal making a profound impact and transformative change on the society through activism in democracy, innovation in governance, and integration of the HAPPINESS index into mainstream economic theory and development works in emerging nations.

He was a Fulbright Fellow while pursuing his Bsc. in Engineering at the University of Kansas and a Dispute Resolution Fellow at the Straus Institute of Dispute Resolution while pursuing his MBA at Pepperdine University. In 2017, he completed his Ford Foundation Mason Fellowship in the Mid Career Masters in Public Administration program at the Harvard Kennedy School. He spent 2018 as a fellow at the Harvard Kennedy School's Ash Center for Democratic Governance and Innovation.

References

Living people
Bhutanese MNAs 2013–2018
21st-century Bhutanese politicians
Druk Phuensum Tshogpa politicians
Bhutanese politicians
1966 births
University of Kansas alumni
Pepperdine University alumni
Harvard Kennedy School alumni
Bhutanese chief executives
Druk Phuensum Tshogpa MNAs